George Walker "Big Nick" Nicholas (August 2, 1922 – October 29, 1997) was an American jazz saxophonist and singer.
Strongly influenced by his hero, Coleman Hawkins, Nicholas in turn influenced a young John Coltrane to compose his tribute "Big Nick", included on the 1962 album Duke Ellington & John Coltrane.

Nicholas contributed the 16-bar solo to Dizzy Gillespie's classic African-Cuban jazz piece "Manteca" (1947). At that time, he also started playing with Hot Lips Page, a working relationship that continued until 1954. He joined Buck Clayton in 1955.

Nicholas started playing with Hank and Thad Jones, Earl Hines, and Tiny Bradshaw before going into the army and, on being discharged in the late 1940s, he worked with bands led by Sabby Lewis, J. C. Heard, and Lucky Millinder. He went on to play with Duke Ellington, Cab Calloway, Charlie Parker, and Charlie Mingus.

Nicholas died of heart failure in October 1997 at the age of 75.

Discography

As leader
1984: Big and Warm (India Navigation)
1985: Big Nick (India Navigation)

As sideman
 1951 Trombone by Three, Bennie Green
 1952 In Paris, Dizzy Gillespie
 1952 Modern Jazz Trombone Series Vol. 2, J.J. Johnson
 1956 Jazz Spectacular, Buck Clayton
 1956 Trombone by Three, Bennie Green/J.J. Johnson/Kai Winding
 2001 1946–1950, Hot Lips Page
 2001 Manteca, Dizzy Gillespie
 2002 Bebop Professor, Dizzy Gillespie
 2002 Go Ahead and Blow, Bennie Green
 2003 1944–1950: It's Magic, Sarah Vaughan
 2005 Memories of You, Illinois Jacquet

References

1922 births
1997 deaths
American jazz saxophonists
American male saxophonists
Jazz-blues saxophonists
American jazz singers
India Navigation artists
Musicians from Lansing, Michigan
20th-century American singers
Jazz musicians from Michigan
20th-century American saxophonists
Singers from Michigan
20th-century American male musicians
American male jazz musicians